The Bell Labs Technical Journal is the in-house scientific journal for scientists of Nokia Bell Labs, published yearly by the IEEE society. The managing editor is Charles Bahr.

The journal was originally established as the Bell System Technical Journal (BSTJ) in New York by the American Telephone and Telegraph Company (AT&T) in 1922, published under this name until 1983, when the breakup of the Bell System placed various parts of the system into separate companies. The journal was devoted to the scientific fields and engineering disciplines practiced in the Bell System for improvements in the wide field of electrical communication. After the restructuring of Bell Labs in 1984, the journal was renamed to AT&T Bell Laboratories Technical Journal. In 1985, it was published as the AT&T Technical Journal until 1996, when it was renamed to Bell Labs Technical Journal.

History
The Bell System Technical Journal was published by AT&T in New York City through its Information Department, on behalf of Western Electric Company and the Associated Companies of the Bell System. The first issue was released in July 1922, under the editorship of R. W. King and an eight-member editorial board. Its mission was to fill the desire for a technical journal to "collect, print, reprint, and make readily the more important articles" for the electrical communication engineer in a broad array of related disciplines, that were previously scattered in numerous other industry publications.

From 1922 to 1951, the publication schedule was quarterly. It was bimonthly until 1964, and finally produced ten monthly issues per year until the end of 1983, combining the four summer months into two issues in May and July.

Publication of the journal under the name Bell System Technical Journal ended with Volume 62 by the end of 1983, because of the divestiture of AT&T. Under new organization, publication continued as AT&T Bell Laboratories Technical Journal in 1984 with Volume 63, maintaining the volume sequence numbers established since 1922. In 1985, Bell Laboratories was removed from the title, resulting in AT&T Technical Journal until 1995 (Volume 74).

In 1996, the journal was revamped under the name Bell Labs Technical Journal, and publication management was transferred to Wiley Periodicals, Inc., establishing a new volume sequence (Volume 1).

Editors
The journal was directed by the following former editors:
1922 (July) R.W. King
1954 J.D. Tebo 
1957 (May) W.D. Bulloch 

1959 (January) H.S. Renne 
1961 (March)   G.E. Schindler, Jr.

Abstracting and indexing
The following abstracting and indexing services cover the journal:

According to the Journal Citation Reports, the journal has a 2020 impact factor of 0.333.

Notable papers
The Bell System Technical Journal and its successors published many papers on seminal works and revolutionary achievements at Bell Labs, including the following:
 In 1928, Clinton Joseph Davisson published a paper on electron diffraction by nickel crystal, thus unambiguously establishing the wave nature of electron. This discovery led to a widespread acceptance of particle-wave duality of matter and won him the 1937 Nobel Prize in Physics.
 Claude Shannon's paper "A Mathematical Theory of Communication", which founded the field of information theory, was published as two-part article in July and October issue of 1948.
 The journal previously published numerous articles disclosing the internal operation of the long-distance switching system used in direct distance dialing (DDD) in the Bell System in the 1950s and 1960s. Articles such as those by A.Weaver and N.A. Newel (In-Band Single-Frequency Signaling), and by C. Breen and C.A. Dahlbom (Signaling Systems for Control of Telephone Switching) enabled phone phreaks to develop the blue box apparatus, which mimicked the switching system's signals to allow them to make free long-distance calls.
 Many landmark papers from the developers of the UNIX operating system appeared in the UNIX themed July and August 1978 issue.
 The 2009 Nobel Prize physicists Willard Boyle and George E. Smith described their new charge-coupled device in the journal in a 1970 paper.

See also
TWX Magazine
Bell Laboratories Record
Scientific journal

References

External links
The Bell System Technical Journal, Volumes 1 through 36 (1922-1957) archived at The Internet Archive
 1922-1960
CAS Source Index (CASSI), search for Bell System Technical Journal

Defunct journals of the United States
Publications established in 1996
Publications established in 1922
IEEE academic journals
Engineering journals
Publications disestablished in 1983
Bell Labs
English-language journals
House organs
Telephony